Hessel is a Dutch male given name. People named Hessel include:

Hessel Gerritsz (c.1581–1632), Dutch engraver, cartographer and publisher
Hessel Hermana (died c.876), 3rd Magistrate governor of Frisia
Hessel van der Kooi (born 1950), Dutch pop singer 
Hessel Martena (died 1312), 10th Magistrate governor of Frisia
Hessel Miedema (born 1929), Dutch art historian
Hessel Oosterbeek (born 1959), Dutch economist
Hessel Rienks (1932–2014), Dutch Labour Party politician
Hessel de Vries (1916–1959), Dutch physicist

References

Dutch masculine given names